was a Japanese businessman and chairman of Hitachi. He became the 10th president of Hitachi in 2010, and in 2014, assumed the position of chairman and CEO. He was also chairman of the compensation committee and general manager of the post-earthquake reconstruction & redevelopment division.  Nakanishi acted as head of the Japan Business Federation from 2018 until his resignation less than a month before his death.

Early life and education
Nakanishi was born in Yokohama, Japan on March 14, 1946. He studied electrical engineering at the University of Tokyo, obtaining a bachelor's degree in 1970 and joining Hitachi one month later. He later attended Stanford University, receiving a master's degree in computer engineering in 1979.

Business career

Nakanishi joined Hitachi's Omika Works Computer Control Design Department in 1970 immediately after graduating from college. His first management position was in the Information and Telecommunications Group. He became the managing director of Hitachi Europe in 1998, before being promoted to senior vice president six years later. He became the chairman of Hitachi America and chairman of Hitachi Global Storage Technologies in 2007.  This was regarded as a "consolation prize" for being passed on as the parent company's president.  However, he and other colleagues were called back to the parent group after it sustained record losses for a Japanese manufacturer in 2009.

Nakanishi became president of Hitachi in 2010.  He started the Smart Transformation Project which restructured the company following the global financial crisis, including the sale of HGST (Hitachi storage business) to Western Digital.  He established a board of directors at Hitachi similar to ones in the Western world, with non-executive directors holding a majority.  Under his leadership, the company gradually decreased the number of its subsidiaries listed on the Tokyo Stock Exchange from over twenty to just two.

Nakanishi was chosen as chairman of the Japan Business Federation (Keidanren) in 2018.  This was welcomed by local and international investors, who saw the election of the reformist Nakanishi to the conservative business lobby as recognition by the Keidanren that it needed to make improvements to corporate governance.  As chairman, he advocated for the government to invest in digital technology, a drive supported by Yoshihide Suga upon becoming prime minister in 2020.  He was also instrumental in prompting the Federation to support the country's promise to become carbon neutral by 2050, in spite of its traditional opposition to climate change initiatives.

Later life
Nakanishi received treatment for lymphoma starting in 2019.  He was hospitalized again in mid-July 2020, and reportedly in remission in March 2021.  However, the cancer returned one month later, and he resigned as chairman of the Japan Business Federation at the end of May.  This was the first time that the head of the business lobby resigned before completing his term.  He died less than a month later on June 27, at the age of 75.

References

1946 births
2021 deaths
Deaths from lymphoma
Hitachi
Honorary Knights Commander of the Order of the British Empire
21st-century Japanese businesspeople
Japanese chairpersons of corporations
People from Yokohama
Stanford University alumni
University of Tokyo alumni